Giaour or Gawur (from  gâvor, an obsolete variant of modern گبر gaur, originally derived from ; ; ; ;) meaning "infidel", was a slur historically used in the Ottoman Empire for non-Muslims or, more particularly, Christians in the Balkans.

Terminology
The terms "kafir", "gawur", and "rûm" (the last meaning "Roman"—actually referring to the Greek population, since they were descended from the Eastern Roman Empire) were commonly used in defters (tax registries) for Orthodox Christians, usually without ethnic distinction. Christian ethnic groups in the Balkan lands of the Ottoman Empire included Greeks (rûm), Bulgarians (bulgar), Serbs (sırp), Christian Albanian (arnavut) and Vlachs (eflak), among others.

The 1911 Encyclopædia Britannica described the term as follows:

During the Tanzimat (1839-1876), the use of the term by Muslims for non-Muslims was prohibited to prevent problems occurring in social relationships.

European cultural references

Giaour is the name given to the evil monster of a man in the tale Vathek, written by William Beckford in French in 1782 and translated into English soon after. The spelling Giaour appears in the French as well as in the English translation.
In 1813 Lord Byron published his poem The Giaour: A Fragment of a Turkish Tale, whose themes revolve around the ideas of love, death, and afterlife in Western Europe and the Ottoman Empire.
 Le Giaour, an 1832 painting by Ary Scheffer, oil on canvas, "Musée de la Vie romantique", Hôtel Scheffer-Renan, Paris.

See also

 Gabr, Persian equivalent
 Kafir, Arabic equivalent
 Dhimmi
 Rayah
 Guiri is Spanish slang for a foreign tourist. According to Juan Goytisolo, it is derived from Turkish gâvur.

Notes

References

Islam-related slurs
Turkish words and phrases
Ethno-cultural designations
Christianity in the Ottoman Empire
Exonyms